Admiral Sir Frank Roddam Twiss,  (7 July 1910 – 27 January 1994) was a senior Royal Navy officer who served as Second Sea Lord and Chief of Naval Personnel from 1967 to 1970. He went on to serve as Gentleman Usher of the Black Rod from 1970 to 1978.

Naval career
The son of Lieutenant Colonel Edward Twiss and his first wife Margaret Edmondson née Tate, he joined the Royal Navy as a cadet in 1924.

He was the last captain of  before she was transferred to the Peruvian Navy on 9 February 1960.

Twiss was appointed Naval Secretary to the First Lord in 1960. Lord Carrington, who had been First Lord of the Admiralty when Twiss was Naval Secretary, later said:

Twiss was appointed Flag Officer Flotillas for the Home Fleet in 1962. He went on to be Commander-in-Chief, Far East Fleet in 1965 and Second Sea Lord and Chief of Naval Personnel in 1967. In that capacity he presided over the abolition of the naval rum ration. He retired in 1970.

Later life
In retirement, Twiss served as Gentleman Usher of the Black Rod from 1970 to 1978 and was a member of Commonwealth War Graves Commission from 1970 to 1979.

Notes

|-

|-

|-

1910 births
1994 deaths
British World War II prisoners of war
Ushers of the Black Rod
Graduates of Britannia Royal Naval College
Knights Commander of the Order of the Bath
Knights Commander of the Royal Victorian Order
Lords of the Admiralty
Recipients of the Distinguished Service Cross (United Kingdom)
Royal Navy officers of World War II
Royal Navy admirals
Serjeants-at-arms of the House of Lords
World War II prisoners of war held by Japan